The small sword or smallsword (also court sword, Gaelic:  or claybeg, French:  or dress sword) is a light one-handed sword designed for thrusting which evolved out of the longer and heavier rapier of the late Renaissance. The height of the small sword's popularity was between mid 17th and late 18th century, when any man, civilian or military, with pretensions to gentlemanly status would have worn a small sword on a daily basis.

It usually tapers to a sharp point but may lack a cutting edge. It is typically triangular in cross-section, although some of the early examples still have the rhombic and spindle-shaped cross-sections inherited from older weapons, like the rapier. This triangular cross-section may be hollow ground for additional lightness. Many small swords of the period between the 17th and 18th centuries were found with colichemarde blades.

It is thought to have appeared in France and spread quickly across the rest of Europe. The small sword was the immediate predecessor of the French duelling sword (from which the épée developed) and its method of use—as typified in the works of such authors as Sieur de Liancour, Domenico Angelo, Monsieur J. Olivier, and Monsieur L'Abbat—developed into the techniques of the French classical school of fencing. The small sword could be a highly effective duelling weapon.

Militarily, small swords continued to be used as a standard sidearm for infantry officers. In some branches with strong traditions, this practice continues to the modern day, albeit for ceremonial and formal dress only. The carrying of swords by officers in combat conditions was frequent  in World War I and still saw some practice in World War II. The 1913 U.S. Army Manual of Bayonet Drill includes instructions for how to defend against an opponent with a smallsword.
 Bayonets of the period, such as the British Pattern 1907 bayonet, were relatively long with total lengths of 20 inches or more not uncommon. While a little larger, a smallsword could be carried in a very similar manner and would not appear out of place.

Hilt
The small sword guard is typically of the "shell" type, sometimes with two lobes that were decorated as clam shells. However, they were maintained in a usable state on some weapons, including the Italian foil, into the 20th century.

In the 19th century, simple cross-hilt small swords were also produced, largely as ceremonial weapons that were evocative of more ancient types of weapons. An example is the Model 1840 Army Noncommissioned Officers' Sword, which is still used by the United States Army on ceremonial occasions.  As the wearing of swords fell out of fashion and the small sword evolved into the duelling sword (forerunner of the modern épée), the older hilts gave way to simpler grips such as the French grip and Italian grip.

Use
Small swords were used both by the military (where they served more as a sign of a certain rank rather than a real weapon for close combat) and as a dueling weapon. The very height of the small sword's widespread popularity was (as mentioned above) between the middle of the 17th and the late 18th century, when it was considered fashionable by aristocrats ("no gentleman was dressed without his sword" – contemporary idiom of the middle of the 18th century), but it was still used as a duelling weapon until the middle of the 20th century. For instance, Gaston Defferre and René Ribière used larger and heavier versions of the épée, which both had small sword-blades instead of the flexible épée-blades (which have been used in sport fencing through the present day) in their duel on April 21, 1967 in Neuilly, Paris. The use of the small sword for infantry is covered in the US manual of 1861 titled "The Militiaman's Manual". It can be obtained here.

In modern times, the sword is often used as part of court uniform and dress.

References

Early Modern European swords
17th-century weapons
18th-century weapons
19th-century weapons
Victorian-era weapons of the United Kingdom